Aeolus (Dongfeng Fengshen) is an automobile marque owned by the Chinese automaker Dongfeng Passenger Vehicle Company, a division of Dongfeng Motor Group. The brand was launched in July 2009 using the Fengshen name, and was later renamed to Aeolus as the English name, while the Chinese name remained the same.

Some of its products are based on those of PSA Peugeot Citroën, such as Fengshen L60, launched by Dongfeng Peugeot-Citroën in 2015.

History

The Fengshen name was first used as a vehicle model name by Yunbao Automobile, a joint-venture set up by the Taiwanese Yulon Motor. During the late 1990s, Nissan of Japan was formally added as a partner in the Yunbao joint-venture which resulted in the first Fengshen, the Yunbao Fengshen 7200, a rebadged model line based on the Nissan Bluebird U13 that was launched in the Chinese market in 1998. Later in 2003, Nissan bought Yulon's share in the joint-venture which became Dongfeng-Nissan, and later the Fengshen name was chosen to become the name of the new sub-brand.

The first Fengshen production model, an A-class four-door sedan called the Fengshen S30, was unveiled at the Auto Shanghai motor show in April 2009 and went on sale in China in July 2009.

In June 2010, Dongfeng began the construction of an engine plant in Hebei province for the manufacture of self-developed engines for Fengshen vehicles.

The Fengshen H30, a mid-sized five-door hatchback, was officially launched in January 2011. The Fengshen H30 Cross, a compact five-door SUV, made its debut at the Auto Shanghai motor show in April 2011 and went on sale in China in the same month. The Fengshen A60, a compact sedan based on the Nissan Sylphy, made its debut at the Auto Guangzhou motor show in November 2011 and went on sale in China in March 2012.

In April 2012, Dongfeng announced that it would establish a multi-brand dealership network across China selling Fengshen, Dongfeng Fengxing and Zhengzhou Nissan vehicles.

Fengshen vehicles went on sale outside China for the first time in August 2012, when the marque was launched in Venezuela.

Products
The current Fengshen range comprises the following models:
Fengshen Yixuan (D53) / Yixuan Mach Edition, a compact sedan 
Fengshen Yixuan GS, a compact crossover wagon
Fengshen Yixuan Max (G35) / Yixuan Max Night Edition, a mid-size sedan
Fengshen A60 CNG, a compact four-door sedan now only available with CNG.
Fengshen E70, an electric compact four-door sedan based on the A60.
Fengshen AX7 Mach Edition, a compact five-door CUV
Aeolus Haoji, a compact five-door CUV

Previous models:
Fengshen E30, a city car 
Fengshen E30L, a city car
Fengshen H30, a compact five-door hatchback 
Fengshen S30, a subcompact four-door sedan based on the platform of the Citroën Fukang
Fengshen A30, a subcompact four-door sedan
Fengshen L60, a compact sedan based on the platform of the Peugeot 408
Fengshen A9, an executive four-door sedan
Fengshen H30 Cross, a subcompact five-door CUV
Fengshen AX3, a subcompact five-door CUV
Fengshen AX4, a subcompact five-door CUV
Fengshen AX5, a compact five-door CUV

Sales
Fengshen products are currently sold in China and Venezuela.

Notes

References

External links
 

Dongfeng Motor
Car brands